Pseudoeurycea ruficauda, also known as the orange-tailed agile salamander, is a species of salamander in the family Plethodontidae. It is endemic to the Sierra Mazateca, a part of Sierra Madre de Oaxaca of Mexico. The specific name ruficauda derives from the Latin words rufous (=reddish) and cauda (=tail) and refers to the reddish orange tail of this salamander. P. jaguar is its closest relative.

Description
The tail is slightly shorter than SVL in most individuals. The head is relatively large with large, protruding eyes. The body is slender and the legs are long. The hands and feet are broadly spread and have long, separated digits. Dorsal coloration is orange-tan with coppery-gold highlights mixed with black. The dorsal stripe is irregular and sometimes interrupted; its color varies from tan-yellow to orange to reddish brown. The tail is orange with black spots and a vivid, red-orange to yellow-orange tip.

Habitat and conservation
It is arboreal and can be found under the bark of logs, in epiphytes, and in stone crevices. Presumably, development is direct (i.e., there is no free-living larval stage).

Although common within its known range consisting of only two localities, the quantity and quality of its habitat are declining because of small-scale farming and wood extraction. It is not known to occur in any protected areas.

References

ruficauda
Endemic amphibians of Mexico
Fauna of the Sierra Madre de Oaxaca
Amphibians described in 2004
Taxa named by David B. Wake
Taxonomy articles created by Polbot